A record club was a mail-order retail club for selling records/tapes promoted by the major record labels during the 1950s onwards.

Major clubs included
EMI Records club founded in 1965
Columbia House (redirect from Columbia Record Club)  established in 1955. It had a significant market presence in the 1970s/1980s, CBS Records
Capitol Record Club, Capitol Records
Citidal Record Club
Britannia Music Club, Polygram
World Record Club Ltd. company in the United Kingdom which issued long-playing records and reel-to-reel tapes, mainly  classical
Record Club of America founded in 1966
RCA Music Service RCA's record club (launched in the mid-1950s), was the main competitor to CBS-owned Columbia House

Customers usually joined record clubs by agreeing to buy a certain number of records, but a significant number of members would not pay for records they ordered. Record companies saw lower royalties from sales through record clubs than from sales through stores and other means. Also, the clubs could give away up to one free record for every record sold--resulting in about half as much revenue for record companies as they might get through other kinds of distributors.

See also
Beck's Record Club musical project initiated by Beck Hansen in June 2009
Darlington Record Club club in the NASCAR Grand National and Winston Cup Series from 1959 to about 2001, based at Darlington Raceway

References

Music retailers
Mail-order retailers